= In a Courtyard, Tangier =

Painting by Philippe Pavy

- Artist: Philippe Pavy
- Year: 1886
- Medium: Oil on wood
- Dimensions: 45.7 cm × 28.6 cm (18.0 in × 11.3 in)
- Location: Metropolitan Museum of Art; New York City

In a Courtyard, Tangier is a late 19th-century painting by French artist Philippe Pavy. Done in oil on wood, the work depicts a young woman resting in a Tangerian courtyard. The painting was one of a series of paintings Pavy produced after he traveled in North Africa in the 1880s. It is currently in the collection of the Metropolitan Museum of Art.
